CFBS may refer to:

CFBS-FM, a community radio station in Canada
Chemin de Fer de la Baie de Somme, a heritage railway in France.